Denise Desautels (born 4 April 1945) is a québécoise poet and writer.

She was a vice-president of the Académie des lettres du Québec. She participates in Metropolis bleu.

Honors 
 1990 – Prix du Gouverneur général
 1990 – Prix littéraires du Journal de Montréal
 1991 – Grand Prix du Festival international de la poésie de la Fondation Les Forges
 1992 – Prix de poésie Terrasses Saint-Sulpice, Le Saut de l'ange
 1993 – Prix Le Signet d'Or, Le Saut de l'ange
 1993 – Prix du Gouverneur général
 1999 – Prix littéraires Radio-Canada, Ma Sisyphe
 2000 – Prix de la Société des écrivains Canadiens
 2001 – Prix de la Société des écrivains Canadiens
 2009 – Prix Athanase-David
 2010 – Prix de littérature francophone Jean Arp
 2014 – Grand prix Québecor du Festival international de la poésie

Bibliography 
 Comme miroirs en feuilles, éditions du Noroît, 1975
 Marie, tout s'éteignait en moi, éditions du Noroît, 1977
 La Promeneuse et l'oiseau, éditions du Noroît, 1980
 Le Cri, dramatique radiophonique, Radio Canada, 1982
 En état d'urgence, éd. Estérel, 1982
 L'Écranprécédé de Aires du temps, éditions du Noroît, 1983
 : dimanche, éditions  de la Nouvelle Barre du Jour, 1985
 Les gitanes, dramatique radiophonique, Radio-Canada, 1985
 Nous en reparlerons sans doute, en collaboration avec Anne-Marie Alonzo, éd. Trois, 1986
 La Répétition, éditions de la Nouvelle Barre du Jour, 1986
 Écritures / ratures, éditions du Noroît, 1986
 Le Signe discret, éd. Pierre-Alain Pingoud, 1987
 Un livre de Kafka à la main suivi de La Blessure, éditions du Noroît, 1987
 Voix, texte, dramatique primée par les radios publiques de langue française, Radio-Canada, Radio France et Radio Suisse normande, 1987
 Mais la menace est une belle extravagance, éditions du Noroît, 1989, Prix de poésie du Journal de Montréal
 Venise (variations sur l'utopie), dramatique radiophonique, Radio-Canada, Radio France et Radio Suisse normande, 1989
 Leçons de Venise, éditions du Noroît, 1990, prix de la Fondation Les Forges
 La violoncelliste, dramatique radiophonique, Radio Canada, 1990
 La voix de Martha, fiction poétique, Radio Canada, 1990
 Tombeau de René Payant, Éditions Trois, 1991 
 Black words, Collectif Génération, 1991
 Le saut de l'ange, éditions du Noroît, 1992, prix du Gouverneur général du Canada et de la revue Estuaire
 Théâtre pourpre, Éditions Jean-Luc Herman, 1993
 La répétition, texte poétique adapté pour la radio, diffusion suisse romande, 1993
 Lettres à Cassandre, en collaboration avec Anne-Marie Alonzo, Trois, 1994
 Cimetières : la rage muette, éditions Dazibao, 1995 
 L'écho, la chambre, la nuit, Éditions Raina Lupa, 1996
 La Passion du sens, éditions Roselin, 1996
 L'Acier le Bleu, Éditions Raina Lupa, 1996
 Le Vif de l'étreinte, livre-objet, Éditions Roselin, 1996
 "Ma joie", crie t'elle, éditions du Noroît, 1997
 De la douceur, livre-objet, Éditions Roselin et Éditions La cour pavée, 1997
 Tombeau de Lou, éditions du Noroît, 2000, prix de la Société des écrivains Canadiens et de la Société Radio-Canada
 Parfois les astres, livre-objet, Roselin, 2000
 Novembre, éditions Roselin et La Cour Pavée, 2001
 Architectures, livre-objet, ed. Tandem, La Sétérée et Roselin, 2001
 Pendant la mort, éditions Québec Amériques, 2002
 Avant l'aurore, in Noir, portfolio réalisé en collaboration avec des artistes, Noria Éditions/Karin Haddad, 2002
 Le Corps collectionneur, Les Heures Bleues, 2003 
 L'Étrangère, no 4–5, Lettre volée, 2003
 La MarathonienneLa courte échelle, 2003
 Une Solitude exemplaire, eaux-fortes de Jacques Clerc, Éditions La Sétérée, 2004
 Mémoires parallèles, choix et présentation de Paul Chamberland, éditions du Noroît, 2004
 Ce fauve, le Bonheur, éditions de l'Hexagone, 2005 
 L'Enfant mauve, livre-objet en collaboration avec Jacques Fournier et Jacqueline Ricard, Éditions Roselin et Éditions de la Cour pavée, 2004
 Ce désir toujours : un abécédaire, Lemeac, 2005 
 L'Œil au ralenti, éditions du Noroit, 2007 
 Le Cœur et autres mélancolies, Éditions Apogée, 2007
 Ailleurs – Épisode I : Charleville-Mézières 2008 : une année en poésie, poésie (collectif), éd. Musée Rimbaud, Charleville-Mézières, 2009
 Quai Rimbaud, livre d'artiste en collaboration avec Jacques Fournier et Gabriel Belgeonne, Éditions Roselin et Éditions Tandem, 2009
 Ailleurs – Épisode II : Charleville-Mézières 2009 : une année en poésie, poésie (collectif), éd. Musée Rimbaud, Charleville-Mézières, 2010
 L'Angle noir de la joie, poésie, coédition Éditions Arfuyen (Paris) et Édition du Noroît (Montréal), 2011 –  à l'occasion de la remise du Prix de littérature francophone Jean Arp
 Sans toi, je n'aurais pas regardé si haut. Tableaux d'un parc, éditions du Noroît, 2013

Works in English 
The Night Will be Insistent: Selected Poems, 1987–2002 Translated by Daniel Sloate, Guernica Editions, 2007, 
Things That Fall, Translated by Alisa Belanger, Guernica Editions, 2013,

Notes

External links

https://web.archive.org/web/20160303182941/http://www.maisondelapoesie-nantes.com/htm/auteur/desautels1.htm

Canadian women poets
Writers from Montreal
1945 births
Living people
Canadian poets in French
20th-century Canadian poets
21st-century Canadian poets
Canadian radio writers
Women radio writers
Canadian women dramatists and playwrights
20th-century Canadian dramatists and playwrights
21st-century Canadian women writers
20th-century Canadian women writers
Canadian dramatists and playwrights in French